Erina Ike (born 2 May 1995) is a Japanese judoka.

She is the gold medallist of the 2016 Judo Grand Prix Qingdao in the -70 kg category.

References

External links
 

1996 births
Living people
Japanese female judoka
21st-century Japanese women